Cymonomidae is a family of crustaceans belonging to the order Decapoda.

Genera:
 Curupironomus Tavares, 1993
 Cymonomoides Tavares, 1993
 Cymonomus Milne-Edwards, 1880
 Cymopolus Milne-Edwards, 1880
 Elassopodus Tavares, 1993

References

Decapods
Decapod families